The Colorado River is a river in the south of Argentina.

The Colorado River marks most of the political boundary between the Argentine provinces of Neuquén and Mendoza, and between Rio Negro and La Pampa. Its man-made dam, "Embalse Casa de Piedra," serves both to generate hydroelectricity for the arid region the river traverses, and to regulate the river's water level.

Course
Its sources are on the eastern slopes of the Andes in the same latitude as the Chilean volcano Tinguiririca (about 34° 48' S.) and takes a generally east-southeast course toward the Atlantic Ocean. After leaving the vicinity of the Andes, the Colorado flows through a barren, arid territory, and receives no tributary of note except the Salado (or Curacó) from La Pampa Province—although it was once an outlet of the now-closed lake basin of Laguna Urre Lauquen. The bottom lands of the Colorado, in its course across Patagonia, are fertile and wooded, but too small in area to support more than a small, scattered population. It is nearly  if calculated Río Desaguadero within.

Naming
The river has usually been described as formed by the confluence of the Grande and the Barrancas. However, since the Barrancas is only a small stream compared to the Grande, it is more accurate to describe the Barrancas as a tributary that joins the main river, which is known as the "Grande" above where the Barrancas joins it, and the "Colorado" below that point.

References

External links
 
 

Rivers of Mendoza Province
Rivers of La Pampa Province
Rivers of Río Negro Province
Rivers of Buenos Aires Province
Rivers of Argentina